Martin Gray may refer to:

 Martin Gray (footballer) (born 1971), English former footballer and manager
 Martin Gray (priest) (born 1944), Archdeacon of Lynn
 Martin Gray (writer) (1922–2016), Polish emigrant to the United States and then France who served in the Red Army and NKVD but also claims to be a survivor of the Holocaust
 Martin Gray (spirituality scholar) (born 1954), American researcher, photographer and writer on sacred sites

See also
 Martín Garay (born 1999), Argentine footballer